Lowzu (also Romanized as Lowzū) is a village in Seyfabad Rural District, in the Central District of Khonj County, Fars Province, Iran. At the 2006 census, its population was 9, in 4 families.

References 

Populated places in Khonj County